The Ecuadorian Socialist Party is a leftist political party in Ecuador. It was born in 1926, and it was refounded in 1995 after the fusion between the Ecuadorian Socialist Party (Founded in 1926) and the Leftist Broad Front, which was the electoral wing of the Communist Party of Ecuador. Currently, it is the oldest continuously existent party in Ecuador.

Reference 

1926 establishments in Ecuador
Political parties established in 1926
Socialist parties in Ecuador